Setanta Golf was a television channel from Setanta Sports dedicated to the sport of golf.

Broadcasting
The channel was available in the UK on Sky Digital channel 429, Tiscali TV channel 557 and Virgin Media channel 543. It was a premium channel on Sky but included on Virgin's XL pack. In the Republic of Ireland it was available on UPC Ireland and Sky Digital.

Content
From its launch, the United States based PGA Tour was the mainstay of Setanta Golf's programming schedule. The channel also included coverage of the over 50s Champions Tour. Other programs included The Big Break and Highway 18 from The Golf Channel, and Shell's Wonderful World of Golf. Many programming hours were also taken up with advertising features, mainly for JJB Sports licensed Slazenger and Nike products.

PGA Tour coverage started with the first two tournaments from Hawaii and included all the regular season tournaments except for the majors, for which the rights are held by BBC Sport and Sky.

Demise
Having run into financial difficulties, on 23 June 2009, Setanta ceased broadcasting all its channels in the United Kingdom.

References

Sports television channels in the United Kingdom
Television channels and stations established in 2007
Television channels and stations disestablished in 2009
Defunct television channels in the United Kingdom
Golf on television